Mezi námi zloději is a 1963 Czechoslovak film. The film starred Josef Kemr., Otomar Krejča, Vladimír Menšík, Jiří Sovák, Jaroslav Vojta, Stella Zázvorková, František Filipovský, Eman Fiala, Věra Ferbasová. Director: Vladimír Čech.

References

External links
 

1963 films
Czechoslovak comedy films
1960s Czech-language films
Czech comedy films
1960s Czech films